Cathy Olesen (born c. 1961) is a politician in Alberta, Canada. She served on Strathcona County Council from 1995, first as a councillor then mayor, until her defeat in 2010. Olesen then went into provincial politics, and represented Sherwood Park from the 2012 provincial election until her defeat in the 2015 provincial election.

Political career
Cathy Olesen successfully ran for County councillor, in the new Ward 4, in 1995. She held this position for three terms, until deciding to take a run for mayor. Olesen become mayor of Strathcona County in 2004, and was re-elected in 2007, in a close three-way race. In 2010 Olesen lost to Linda Osinchuk.

In 2012, with Sherwood Park MLA Iris Evans retiring, Olesen ran for the Progressive Conservative (PC) nomination. She won the PC nomination by only one vote over Susan Timanson. On April 23, 2012, Olesen won the Sherwood Park riding, and successfully made her way into provincial politics. On May 5, 2015 Olesen lost to Annie McKitrick.

Electoral history

2015 general election

References

1960s births
Living people
Women mayors of places in Alberta
Mayors of places in Alberta
Politicians from Winnipeg
Progressive Conservative Association of Alberta MLAs
Women MLAs in Alberta
21st-century Canadian politicians
21st-century Canadian women politicians